Jens Nordqvist (born July 3, 1959) is a Swedish sprint canoer who competed in the early 1980s. He won two medals in the K-4 500 m event at the ICF Canoe Sprint World Championships with a silver in 1981 and a bronze in 1982.

Nordqvist also competing at the 1980 Summer Olympics in Moscow, finishing ninth in the K-2 500 m event while being eliminated in the semifinals of the K-2 1000 m event.

References

1959 births
Canoeists at the 1980 Summer Olympics
Living people
Olympic canoeists of Sweden
Swedish male canoeists
ICF Canoe Sprint World Championships medalists in kayak